Julia Farron  (22 July 1922 – 3 July 2019) was an English ballerina, best known as one of the earliest and all-time youngest members of The Royal Ballet, the leading ballet company based at the Royal Opera House in Covent Garden, London.

Julia Farron was born Joyce Margaret Farron-Smith in London. on 22 July 1922. In 1931, Farron became the first pupil to receive a scholarship to study under the direction of Dame Ninette de Valois at the Vic-Wells Ballet School.  She made her professional stage debut in a pantomime in 1934, aged twelve.  In 1936, having completed five years of study at the ballet school, she joined the Vic-Wells Ballet, becoming the company's youngest member, aged fourteen.

The following year in 1937, she danced her first created role, Pepe the Dog, in the ballet A Wedding Bouquet choreographed by Sir Frederick Ashton.  Farron would stay with the company throughout its development into The Royal Ballet, eventually achieving the rank of principal dancer. In early 1947 Julia danced, alongside Harold Turner, the Neapolitan Tarantella in La Boutique Fantasque  . A respected critic of the time, Audrey Williamson, noted "the bright attack and style that distinguish all her work". After retiring from the professional stage, she was appointed as a teacher at the Royal Ballet School in 1964.  She was appointed assistant director of the Royal Academy of Dance in 1982, becoming Director in 1983. and eventually retired in 1989, with an honorary life fellowship of the organisation (FRAD).  In 1994, the Royal Academy of Dance awarded her the Queen Elizabeth II Coronation Award for outstanding services to ballet.  Most recently, she has sponsored the redevelopment of the White Lodge Museum and Ballet Resource Centre.

Farron was appointed Officer of the Order of the British Empire (OBE) in the 2012 New Year Honours for services to ballet.

She married the South African ballet dancer and choreographer Alfred Rodrigues in 1948, and they had a son, Christopher. She died on 3 July 2019 at the age of 96.

Selected repertoire

Productions by John Cranko
The Prince of the Pagodas
Antigone

Productions by Frederick Ashton
Ondine 
Daphnis and Chloë
Nocturne

Productions by Nicholas Sergeyev
The Sleeping Beauty
Swan Lake

Productions by Kenneth MacMillan
Romeo and Juliet
Giselle

References 

1922 births
2019 deaths
People educated at the Royal Ballet School
English ballerinas
Principal dancers of The Royal Ballet
Officers of the Order of the British Empire